Elizabeth Diane Downs ( Frederickson; born August 7, 1955) is an American criminal who murdered her daughter and attempted to murder her other two children near Springfield, Oregon, in May 1983. Following the crimes, she made claims to police that a man had attempted to carjack her and had shot the children. She was convicted in 1984 and sentenced to life in prison plus fifty years. She briefly escaped in 1987, but was quickly recaptured.

Downs was denied parole in December 2008, December 2010, and in 2020.

Early life
Elizabeth Diane Downs was born on August 7, 1955 in Phoenix, Arizona, to Wesley Linden (1930–2017) and Willadene (Engle) Frederickson. She has testified that her father sexually abused her when she was 12 years old. She tried to cut her wrists when she was 13 years old. Diane came from a family with strict conservative values. Growing up, Diane followed those values, however, after the age of 14, she became more rebellious and eventually dropped "Elizabeth" from her name and went by Diane. Diane graduated from Moon Valley High School in Phoenix, where she met Steve Downs. Despite her parents' disapproval of their relationship, Downs continued the relationship. After high school, she enrolled at Pacific Coast Baptist Bible College in Orange, California, but was expelled after one year for promiscuous behavior and returned to her parents' home in Arizona.

Marriage and children
On November 13, 1973, Diane married Steve Downs after running away from home. Their first child, Christie Ann, was born in 1974. Cheryl Lynn followed in 1976, with Stephen Daniel being born in 1979. The couple divorced in 1980 because Steve thought Stephen Daniel, known as Danny, was the result of an extramarital affair by Diane. On May 8, 1982, Diane gave birth to a baby girl, whom she named Jennifer, while acting as a surrogate. When Downs went to trial in May 1984, she was again pregnant. Prior to her sentencing, Downs gave birth to a baby girl whom she named Amy Elizabeth. The baby was taken by the state and delivered to adoptive parents. That girl was later renamed Rebecca "Becky" Babcock.

Downs was employed by the United States Postal Service, assigned to the mail routes in the city of Cottage Grove, Oregon.

Shortly before her death, Cheryl Lynn reportedly told a neighbor of her grandparents that she was afraid of her mother.

Shootings

On May 19, 1983, Downs shot her three children, and drove them in a blood-spattered car to McKenzie-Willamette Hospital in Springfield, Oregon. Upon arrival, Cheryl (aged 7) was already dead, Danny (aged 3) was paralyzed from the waist down, and Christie (aged 8) had suffered a disabling stroke. Downs herself had been shot in the left forearm. She claimed that she was carjacked on a rural road near Springfield by a strange man who shot her and the children. However, investigators and hospital workers became suspicious, because they decided that Downs' manner was too calm for a person who had just experienced such a traumatic event. She also made a number of statements that both police and hospital workers considered highly inappropriate.

Downs claimed that on a drive home from a friends house, she decided to take the scenic route home. All the kids were asleep as it was past 9 p.m. and her children were fairly young. Downs claimed that during this drive home, around 10 p.m. she saw a strange man standing in the road flagging her down. She said she pulled over and got out to talk to the man. She described him as a "bushy haired stranger". When she got out to talk to this man, he immediately demanded that she give him her car keys, Downs claimed she refused and they got into a physical altercation that resulted in him shooting her in the left arm. He then opened the driver's side door and shot all 3 of her children. Downs then said she pretended to throw her car keys in a bush and the man went to go look for them. While he was looking for the keys, she jumped back in the car and sped off to the nearest hospital.

Suspicions heightened when Downs, upon arrival at the hospital to visit her children, phoned Robert Knickerbocker, a married man and former coworker in Arizona with whom she had been having an affair. The forensic evidence did not match her story; there was no blood spatter on the driver's side of the car, nor was there any gunpowder residue on the driver's door or on the interior door panel. Knickerbocker also reported to police that Downs had stalked him, and seemed willing to kill his wife if it meant that she could have him to herself; he stated that he was relieved that she had left for Oregon, and that he was able to reconcile with his wife.

Diane did not disclose to police that she owned a .22 caliber handgun, but both Steve and Knickerbocker informed authorities that she did. Investigators later discovered that she had bought the handgun in Arizona. While they were unable to find the weapon, they found unfired casings in her home with extractor markings from the murder weapon. Most damaging, witnesses saw her car being driven very slowly toward the hospital, at an estimated speed of —contradicting her claim that she drove to the hospital at a “high speed” after the shooting. Based on this and additional evidence, Downs was arrested on February 28, 1984, nine months after the shooting, and charged with one count of murder, and two counts each of attempted murder and criminal assault.

Prosecution
Prosecutors argued that Downs shot her children to be free of them, so that she could continue her affair with Knickerbocker, as she claimed that he let it be known that he did not want children in his life. Much of the case against her rested on the testimony of her surviving daughter, Christie, who, once she recovered her ability to speak, described how her mother shot all three children while parked at the side of the road, and then shot herself in the arm.

Downs was convicted on all charges on June 17, 1984, and sentenced to life in prison plus fifty years. She was required to serve twenty-five years before being considered for parole. Most of Downs' sentence is to be served consecutively. The judge made it clear that he did not intend for Downs to ever be free again.

Psychiatrists diagnosed her with narcissistic, histrionic, and antisocial personality disorders, labeling her as a “deviant sociopath.”

Aftermath
Downs' two surviving children eventually went to live with the lead prosecutor on the case, Fred Hugi. He and his wife, Joanne, adopted them in 1986. Christie Downs, Diane Downs' first child who testified at her trial, suffers from a speech disability. She has a son (born 2005) and a daughter, whom she named Cheryl in memory of her late sister.

Prior to her arrest, Downs became pregnant with a fifth child, and gave birth to a girl, whom she named Amy Elizabeth, a month after her 1984 trial. Ten days before Downs' sentencing, Amy was seized by the State of Oregon, and adopted by Chris and Jackie Babcock, who subsequently renamed her Rebecca. As an adult, Rebecca (Becky) appeared on The Oprah Winfrey Show and ABC's 20/20, where she discussed how she felt about her biological mother. Rebecca wrote to Downs in her younger years, and has stated that she regrets the contact, regarding her mother as “a monster.” 

Downs was initially incarcerated at the Oregon Women's Correctional Center in Salem. 
On July 11, 1987, she escaped from her cell by scaling an eighteen-foot razor wire fence. For ten days, Downs managed to evade law enforcement—despite a fourteen-state manhunt—before she was recaptured. She received an additional five-year sentence for the escape. After her recapture, Downs was transferred to the New Jersey Department of Corrections Clinton Correctional Facility for Women after heavy lobbying from Hugi. The Salem prison was located 66 miles from Hugi's home in Springfield; during her ten days of freedom, Hugi had feared that Downs would attempt to travel there in hopes of contacting her children, Christie and Danny. Despite significant security upgrades at the women's facility after the escape, state officials accepted Hugi's argument that the risk of harm to Christie and Danny, in the event of another escape, was too great for Downs to remain incarcerated in Oregon.

In 1994, after serving ten years, Downs was transferred to the California Department of Corrections and Rehabilitation. While in prison, she earned an associate degree in General Studies. In 2010, she was relocated to the Valley State Prison for Women in Chowchilla, California, but was transferred out when the facility was converted to an all-male institution in 2013.

Author Ann Rule wrote the book Small Sacrifices (1987), which detailed Downs' life and murder trial. The book documented accounts by friends, acquaintances, neighbors, and her surviving daughter, Christie, who questioned the quality of her parenting. A made-for-TV movie, also titled Small Sacrifices, starred Farrah Fawcett as Downs, and was aired on ABC in 1989.

Parole hearing
Downs' sentence meant she could not be considered for parole until 2009. Under Oregon law at the time, as a dangerous offender, Downs would have been eligible for a parole hearing every two years until she is released or dies in prison.

In her first application for parole in 2008, Downs reaffirmed her innocence. Downs insisted that, “Over the years, I have told you and the rest of the world that a man shot me and my children. I have never changed my story.” Her first parole hearing was on December 9, 2008. Lane County District Attorney Douglas Harcleroad wrote to the parole board: “Downs continues to fail to demonstrate any honest insight into her criminal behavior... even after her convictions, she continues to fabricate new versions of events under which the crimes occurred.” He also wrote that “she alternately refers to her assailants as a bushy-haired stranger, two men wearing ski masks, or drug dealers and corrupt law enforcement officials.” Downs participated in the hearing from the Valley State Prison for Women. She was not permitted a statement, but answered questions from the parole board. After three hours of interviews and thirty minutes of deliberation, she was denied parole.

Downs had parole hearings in 2010 and 2020, which were both denied. Downs maintained her innocence in all parole hearings.

See also

 Crime in Oregon
 Familicide
 Filicide
 List of murdered American children

References 

1955 births
1983 in Oregon
American escapees
American female murderers
American murderers of children
American people convicted of assault
American people convicted of attempted murder
American people convicted of murder
American people of Danish descent
American people of English descent
American prisoners sentenced to life imprisonment
Crimes in Oregon
Criminals from Phoenix, Arizona
Criminals from Oregon
Escapees from Oregon detention
Filicides in the United States
Living people
People convicted of murder by Oregon
People with antisocial personality disorder
People with histrionic personality disorder
People with narcissistic personality disorder
Prisoners sentenced to life imprisonment by Oregon
United States Postal Service people